CZM may stand for:

Coastal Zone Management; see Integrated coastal zone management
Cozumel International Airport
T.W.G.Hs Chen Zao Men College, a secondary school in Hong Kong
CombineZM